This is a list of chapters for the Japanese manga series Vagabond, written and illustrated by Takehiko Inoue.

Volume list

Chapters not yet in volume format
The following chapters have yet to be published in a tankōbon volume.

Hosokawa arc begins:

323. 
324. 
325. 
326. 
327.

References

External links
  
 

Lists of manga volumes and chapters